Blue is the seventh studio album by Angela Aki and was released on Sony Music Japan. Available in two editions, regular and limited, both versions include a signed postcard.

Singles
 "Kokuhaku" (告白 / Confession) is the first single from the album, released on 18 July 2012. The track was used as the ending theme song for the anime Uchuu Kyoudai.

Track listing
CD

DVD

Charts

Release history

References

External links
Oricon Profile: Limited Edition  | Regular Edition

2012 albums
Angela Aki albums
Sony Music Entertainment Japan albums